"Jeune Demoiselle" is the second single from Diam's 2006 album Dans ma bulle.

Track listings

 CD-Single
 "Jeune Demoiselle" (Version Radio) (4:11)
 "Jeune Demoiselle" (Instrumental) (4:02)

 CD-Maxi
 "Jeune Demoiselle" (Version Radio) (4:11)
 "Jeune Demoiselle" (Instrumental) (4:02)
 "Jeune Demoiselle" (Video) (4:14)
 "Jeune Demoiselle" (Making of)
 Video (3:45)
 Lyrics

Charts

Certifications

References

2006 singles
Diam's songs
Songs written by Diam's
2006 songs